Motipur  is a village development committee in Kapilvastu District in the Lumbini Zone of southern Nepal. At the time of the 1991 Nepal census it had a population of 7710 people living in 1331 individual households.

References

Populated places in Kapilvastu District